John Wesley Holder  (born 2 February 1934), known professionally as Ram John Holder, is a Guyanese-British actor and musician, who began his professional career as a singer in New York City, before moving to England in 1962. He has performed on stage, in both film and television and, is best known for playing Augustus "Porkpie" Grant in the British television series Desmond's.

Background
Holder's parents were devout members of the USA-based Pilgrim Holiness Church. He grew up in Georgetown, Guyana, during the 1940s and 1950s. Influenced by the church and the musical talents of his parents, he became quite accomplished playing the guitar. During the early '50s, the strict, strait-laced church membership was scandalised when he broke away and changed his name to "Ram" John. Holder began to perform as a folk singer in New York City.

Acting career
In 1962, Holder arrived in London and worked with Pearl Connor's Negro Theatre Workshop initially as a musician, and later as an actor. Holder performed at several London theatres including the National Theatre, the Donmar Warehouse and Bristol Old Vic.

His first major film role was as the effeminate dancer Marcus in Ted Kotcheff's film Two Gentlemen Sharing (1969), which told the story of interracial relations in swinging London. John Boorman then cast him as the black preacher in the comedy film Leo the Last (1970), also about race relations, which was set in a Notting Hill slum in West London. Holder also sang the songs in the film. He again played a preacher in the Horace Ové-directed film Pressure (1975), made a cameo performance in My Beautiful Laundrette (1985) as a poet, and appeared in Sankofa Film and Video's debut feature The Passion of Remembrance (1986). His other film roles included appearances in Britannia Hospital (1982), Half Moon Street (1986), Playing Away (1987), Virtual Sexuality (1999), Lucky Break (2001) and as a Jamaican barber in The Calcium Kid (2004).

Holder played the role of Augustus "Porkpie" Grant in the situation comedy Desmond's, which was written by Trix Worrell, and broadcast on Channel 4 from 1989 until 1994. He later had his own short-lived spin-off series Porkpie. Porkpie was considered one of the most popular characters in Desmond's, and although the spinoff series was short-lived, it was credited with extending the black British presence in the comedy genre. 

Holder joined the cast of EastEnders in late September 2006, playing Cedric Lucas. His last stage performance to date was as Slow Drag in the 2006 revival of August Wilson's Ma Rainey's Black Bottom at the Royal Exchange Theatre in Manchester. In 2017, he appeared in an episode of Death in Paradise as Nelson Myers, the estranged father of main character PC Dwayne Myers (played by Danny John-Jules). Holder reprised his role for three episodes the following year.

He has also appeared as 'Flying' Freddie Mercer in episodes of the BBC Television children's programme The Story of Tracy Beaker. In May 2008 he appeared in an episode of the BBC drama The Invisibles. He is seen in an ensemble part in Song for Marion, a feature film from Paul Andrew Williams, the director of London to Brighton, starring Vanessa Redgrave and Terence Stamp.

Music career
Holder has continued his dual career as a musician. He has recorded the albums Black London Blues (1969), Bootleg Blues (1971), You Simply Are... (1975) and Ram Blues & Soul, as well as various singles and contributed to soundtracks for film and television. He contributed three songs for the film adaptation of Take a Girl Like You (1970).

Honours
Holder was appointed Commander of the Order of the British Empire (CBE) in the 2021 Birthday Honours for services to drama and music.

Personal life
Ram John Holder is the cousin of the jazz vocalist Frank Holder.

Discography

Albums
 Blues+Gospel+Soul (Melodisc Records, 1963)
 Black London Blues (Beacon Records, 1969)
 Bootleg Blues (Beacon Records, 1971)
 You Simply Are... (Fresh Air, 1975)

Singles
 "I Need Somebody" (B Side: "She's Alright"), Columbia, 1967
 "My Friend Jones" (B Side: "It Won't Be Long Before I Love You"), Columbia, 1967
 "I Just Came To Get My Baby" (B Side: "Yes I Do"), Beacon, 1968
 "Goodwill To All Mankind" (B Side: "Goodwill Sermon"), Upfront, 1969
 "Battering Ram, The People's Man" (B Side: "A London Ghetto"), Fresh Air, 1973
 "Battering Ram" (B Side: "London Ghetto"), Fresh Air, 1975

See also
 Desmond's
 Down to Earth
 List of Black Britons
 List of characters from Eastenders
 Porkpie

References

External links
 British Film Institute Screenonline biography
 Guyanese in the United Kingdom (2001)
 
 Talawa Theatre Company
 TV.com database record

1934 births
Living people
English male stage actors
English male soap opera actors
Guyanese emigrants to England
Black British male actors
20th-century Black British male singers
English blues singers
English folk musicians
People from Georgetown, Guyana
20th-century Guyanese male actors
21st-century Guyanese male actors
21st-century British male actors
Recipients of the Wordsworth McAndrew Award
Commanders of the Order of the British Empire